Cymbacha festiva is a species of spiders in the family Thomisidae. It is endemic to Australia where it is found in Queensland and New South Wales.

References 

Spiders described in 1874
Thomisidae